The list of ship launches in 1880 includes a chronological list of some ships launched in 1880.


References

1880
 
1880 in transport